Aisling Diamond is a camogie player. She won a camogie All Star award in 2007.

Career
Aisling Diamond scored the winning goal in the 2007 All Ireland junior final. She was an under-14 star for Bellaghy in the community games in 2000.

References

External links 
 Profile in Cúl4kidz magazine
 Official Camogie Website
 Derry Camogie website
 Ulster Camogie website
  Review of 2009 championship in On The Ball Official Camogie Magazine

Derry camogie players
Year of birth missing (living people)
Living people